James Tillotson Whitehead (March 15, 1936 St. Louis, Missouri - August 16, 2003 Fayetteville, Arkansas) was an American poet and novelist.  He published four books of poetry and one novel, Joiner.

Biography
James Whitehead was born in St. Louis in 1936. He grew up in Jackson, Mississippi, where his family moved after World War II.  Standing six foot 5 inches, and known as "Big Jim" he received a football scholarship at Vanderbilt University.  However, a serious injury there dashed any hopes he had of a professional career.  Instead, he focused on his studies, earning a bachelor's degree in philosophy, then staying for a master's degree in English.  He then went to the University of Iowa where he acquired an M.F.A. in creative writing.

Whitehead then joined his college friend William Harrison in founding the creative writing program at the University of Arkansas in Fayetteville.  They were soon joined by poet Miller Williams, and the three men continued to build what would become one the nations most distinguished writing programs.  Whitehead taught at Arkansas for 34 years, from 1965 to 1999.  In 2003 he died on the 44th anniversary of his marriage with Guendaline Graeber Whitehead, with whom he had seven children.  He was 67.

Whitehead's only published novel, Joiner, came in 1971.  The story about an intellectual NFL tackle from segregated Mississippi received wide acclaim from the most respected reviewers including the New York Times, the Boston Globe and the Washington Post.  In reviewing the book for Times, novelist R. V. Cassill, wrote: "What Whitehead has achieved is to sound the full range of the Deep South's exultation and lament. Once again, we are told that Mississippi is our Ireland, in literature and politics. His tirade makes an awesome, fearful and glorious impact on the mind and ear."  Many people, including President Jimmy Carter considered Joiner to be “one of the South’s best novels.”

Whitehead was constantly revising and experimenting, sometimes to a fault.  Literary critic James S. Baumlin, on reading Whitehead's cache of unpublished manuscripts, describes Whitehead's “torturous writing process”:
Whitehead was an obsessive reviser, who would give a day’s worrying to a single word or rhythm.  Such care served him well when writing poetry, given the genre’s linguistic concentration; when he wrote fiction, however, this same process led to near-paralysis—to hundreds (literally) of drafts, most starting from scratch, each subtly different from the rest, all drawing on the man’s considerable poetic powers.

Whitehead published four books of poetry: "Domains," "Local Men," "Actual Size" and "Near at Hand."

Works
 Domains, Louisiana State University Press, 1966
 Local Men, University of Illinois Press, 1979, 
 Actual Size Trilobite Press, 1985 (poetry chapbook)
 Near at Hand, University of Missouri Press, 1993, 
 Joiner, Knopf, 1971, ; University of Arkansas Press, 1991,  (novel)
The panther: posthumous poems, Editor Michael Burns, University of Arkansas Press, 2008, 
For, from, about James T. Whitehead: poems, stories, photographs, and recollections, Editor Michael Burns, Photographer Bruce West, Moon City Press, 2009,

Awards
 1972 Guggenheim Fellowship in Fiction 
 Robert Frost Fellowship in Poetry, from Bread Loaf Writers' Conference

References

External links
"Memories of UA educator live in new book", Northwest Arkansas Times, July 12, 2009

20th-century American poets
Writers from St. Louis
1936 births
2003 deaths
Vanderbilt University alumni
Iowa Writers' Workshop alumni
University of Arkansas faculty
Poets from Missouri